Islamic Association of Engineers of Iran is an Iranian political party of engineers affiliated with the Council for Coordinating the Reforms Front.

Party leaders

References 

Reformist political groups in Iran
1991 establishments in Iran
Political parties established in 1991
Engineering organizations